Edmond Chow is a full professor in the School of Computational Science and Engineering of Georgia Institute of Technology. His main areas of research are in designing numerical methods for high-performance computing and applying these methods to solve large-scale scientific computing problems.

Chow was previously with the Center for Applied Scientific Computing, Lawrence Livermore National Laboratory from 1998 to 2005, and D. E. Shaw Research, New York, from 2005 to 2010. He has served as Associate Editor for SIAM Journal on Scientific Computing (2008-2016) and ACM Transactions on Mathematical Software (2012-present). He was Co-Chair of the SIAM Conference on Parallel Processing for Scientific Computing in 2014, and Algorithms Chair of ACM/IEEE International Conference for High Performance Computing, Networking, Storage and Analysis in 2012. Chow has co-authored over 60 articles in peer-reviewed journals and conferences.

Education
Chow received a Hons. B.A.Sc degree in Systems Design Engineering from the University of Waterloo and a Ph.D. degree in Computer Science (minor in Aerospace Engineering) from the University of Minnesota.

Research
Chow is director of the Intel Parallel Computing Center on High-Performance Scientific Simulation. He and his group has developed high-performance, parallel software for quantum chemistry and coarse-grained biochemical simulations. Chow also leads a Department of Energy project collaboration between four institutions on asynchronous iterative methods for extreme-scale computers.

Major honors and awards
 SIAM Fellow in the 2021 class of fellows, "for contributions to computational science and engineering in the areas of numerical linear algebra and high-performance computing".
 Best paper award IEEE International Parallel & Distributed Processing Symposium, 2013 and 2014
 ACM Gordon Bell Prize, 2009
 Best Paper Award ACM/IEEE International Conference for High Performance, Computing, Networking, Storage and Analysis, 2006 and 2009
 U.S. Presidential Early Career Award for Scientists and Engineers (PECASE), 2002
 U.S. Department of Energy Office of Science Early Career Scientist and Engineer Award, 2002

Major publications

References

Year of birth missing (living people)
Living people
Georgia Tech faculty
University of Waterloo alumni
University of Minnesota College of Science and Engineering alumni
Computer scientists
Fellows of the Society for Industrial and Applied Mathematics